Muniandi, also referred to as Munisvaran, is a Tamil rural guardian deity of plantations and estates. He is primarily worshipped by South of Tamilnadu by  Tamil society. He is regarded as a powerful god who protects from diseases and crop failures. He is also recognised as a divine attendant to a major South Indian rural deity, Mariamman.

Etymology
The word Muniandi is a combination of two words, Muni and Andi. The word Andi could be defined in two ways. One referring to slave of God and the other ruling (as in ruler). The second explanation could be derived from the word Andavar, which literally means he who rules. The reason for this explanation is the word Andi being used for other deities in the Tamil pantheon.

Literature

They are actually a Shiva Ganas they are associated with Shiva and it is believed that they actually they came from Shiva's face in 7 forms and then they promise Shiva that they'll protect the holy spirits because of this they guards Mariamman and other tamil goddesses.

Worship

Tree Worship (Maram Vallipadu) 
The trees as such as Banyan (Ala Maram), Peepal (Arasa Maram) and Palmyra (Pana Maram) are believed to be the gateways used by the Munis to travel between different dimensions. The Munis are also believed to reside in such trees. Tree Worship is the oldest form of Muni worship.

Stone Worship (Nadukkal Vallipadu) 
The Stone Worship was mentioned even during Tamil Sangam ages more than 2,500 years ago. Nadukkal or Veerarkal (for warriors) were planted to commemorate the death of someone important. In the Muni worship, it can be divided to either a single stone or three stones (or bricks), decorated with Saivite sacred ash (vibuthi) marks, sandal paste (santhanam) and saffron paste (kungkumam). A trident (soolam) is planted as a mark of Sivan and Shakti.

Statue worship (Uruvam Vallipadu) 
This is the most contemporary form of worship. Statues are erected and decorated to help the devotee visualise on the Muni. Other insignias such as sickle (aruval), sword and mace will be used depending on the type of Muni.

Worship outside India
The deity is also popular amongst the Tamil diaspora outside Tamil Nadu. In Malaysia, Muniandi worship was started by Tamil migrants who had the Munis as their Kula Deivam. The family temples which were built in the estates and villages later turned into public temples. Eventually, more people started worshipping these Munis and it became popularised.

References

 
Muneeswaran Poojai - Pon.Moorthy
Muniswaran Vallipaadu - Murugan Poosari

Tamil deities
Regional Hindu gods
Hindu folk deities